Hector Charles Cameron  (17 July 1878, Glasgow – 1 April 1958) was a British physician and paediatrician.

Biography
Hector Charles Cameron, the younger son of Sir Hector Clare Cameron, was known as Charles Cameron. He was educated at Clifton College and then at the University of Glasgow, before he became in 1898 a Foundation Scholar in Science at St John's College, Cambridge. He graduated there B.A. (Nat. Sci. Trip., 1st Class) in 1901 and won a university scholarship to Guy's Hospital.

At Guy's Hospital he held a variety of posts, including demonstrator of physiology, out-patients officer, house-physician, anaesthetist, and medical registrar, before being appointed assistant physician in 1910, medical school sub-dean in 1911, and medical school dean in 1912. In 1920 he chose to become a paediatric specialist instead of appointment as a full physician. For many years he was editor of the Guy's Hospital Gazette.

Cameron delivered the Lumleian Lectures (Some Forms of Vomiting in Infancy) in 1925. He was Chief Medical Officer for the Motor Union and United British Insurance Co. From the University of Glasgow, he received an M.A. in 1906 and an honorary LL.D. in 1956.

Cameron married in 1908. The marriage produced two daughters.

Selected publications

References

External links

1878 births
1958 deaths
Medical doctors from Glasgow
British paediatricians
People educated at Clifton College
Alumni of St John's College, Cambridge
Physicians of Guy's Hospital
Fellows of the Royal College of Physicians